Itiha Ibrahimpur is a village in Handia Tehsil in Allahabad District of Uttar Pradesh, India, situated on the Ganges river. It belongs to Allahabad Division. It is located 4 km from Handia, 42 km east of Allahabad and 242 km from the state capital Lucknow.

References

External links

Villages in Allahabad district